"Turtanu" or "Turtan" (Akkadian: 𒌉𒋫𒉡 tur-ta-nu;  tartān; ; ;  tartan) is an Akkadian word/title meaning 'commander in chief' or 'prime minister'.  In Assyria, the Turtanu ranked next to the king.

The Assyrian king would assign the individual who was turtanu to go to battle for him, thus giving great power and influence to the turtanu.

The office seems to have been duplicated, and there was a tartanu imni or 'tartan of the right', as well as a tartanu shumeli or 'tartan of the left'. In later times the title became territorial; we read of a tartan of 'Kummuh' (Commagene). The title is also applied to the commanders of foreign armies; thus Sargon speaks of the Tartan Musurai, or 'Egyptian Tartan'. The Tartan of 720 BC was probably called Ashur-iska-danin; in 694 BC, Abdai, and in 686 BC Bel-emurani, held the title. It does not seem to have been in use among the closely related Babylonians.

Tartan in Bible

Examples
Dayyan-Assur was turtanu under the reign of Shalmaneser III (859-824BC).  Dayyan-Assur led campaigns in lieu of Shalmaneser III who gave him power over the Assyrian army. These campaigns took the Assyrian army and influence into the Zagros, where encounters with future opponents the Medes and Manneans.
Another example of a turtanu was Shamshi-ilu.  He was the Assyrian military commander under Adad-Nirari III (811-783BC) and later Shalmaneser IV (783-773) as well as others. He appears to have been of Bit-Adini descent, a province annexed by Assyria some time before. He led a campaign against the Argishti I of Urartu.

Influence
The position of turtanu led to a decline of centralized power in Assyria.  Shamshi-ilu for example, who was turtanu during four kings reigns, and was one of if not the most powerful individual in Assyria at the time (8th century BC), began to lead out his own campaigns without the sanction of the king. Shamshi-ilu was based out of Kar-Shalmaneser and began campaigning for his own kingdom west of the Euphrates.  These campaigns led to greater power held by Shamshi-ilu and a fragmentary Assyria.

See also 
Rabshakeh
Rabsaris
 Encyclopaedia Biblica: Tartan

References

Military history of the Assyrian Empire
Military ranks
Hebrew Bible content
Ancient history of Turkey
History of Assyria